Anban is a 1944 Bollywood social film directed by Niren Lahiri. It stars Pahari Sanyal and Nargis. 
The film was produced by Bharat Productions, with the music by Gyan Dutt.

Soundtrack
The soundtrack was composed by Gyan Dutt and the lyrics are penned by Gajendra.

References

External links
 

1944 films
1940s Hindi-language films
Films scored by Gyan Dutt
Indian black-and-white films